The  is a Japanese automatic grenade launcher made by Howa since 1996.

History
With the need of a heavy fire support weapon in Japan Self-Defense Forces (JSDF) service aside from the use of the Sumitomo Type 62 GPMG and the Sumitomo M2HB machine gun, Howa first created and produced the weapon in 1996.

Use

The Howa Type 96 can be used by both infantry and armored vehicles, the former with a tripod and the latter by being placed on a weapon mount. It is seen as one of the main weapons mounted on the Type 96 Armored Personnel Carrier.

Operational details
On the left side of the Type 96 is a feeding bay where the 40 mm grenades belt can be loaded onto the AGL.

See also
Comparison of automatic grenade launchers

References

External links

 Official JGSDF Page
 Official HOWA Page

Blow forward firearms
Japan Self-Defense Forces
Post–Cold War weapons of Japan
Automatic grenade launchers
Autocannon
40 mm artillery
Military equipment introduced in the 1990s